Hulda-Hrokkinskinna is one of the kings' sagas. Written after 1280, it relates the history of the Norwegian kings from Magnús góði, who acceded to the throne in 1035, to Magnús Erlingsson, who died in 1177. 

The saga is based on Snorri Sturluson's Heimskringla but supplemented by prose and poetry from a version of Morkinskinna which is no longer extant.  Hulda-Hrokkinskinna is especially valuable in places where the preserved Morkinskinna manuscript is defective. It preserves eight verses of skaldic poetry found nowhere else by the poets Arnórr Þórðarson, Þjóðólfr Arnórsson, Bölverkr Arnórsson and Þórarinn stuttfeldr. 

The saga is preserved in two manuscripts. Hulda ("the hidden manuscript") or AM 66 fol. is an Icelandic manuscript from the last part of the 14th century. It consists of 142 leaves while the first six (the first quire) are lost. Hrokkinskinna ("wrinkled parchment") or GKS 1010 fol. is an Icelandic manuscript from the beginning of the fifteenth century. Its first 91 leaves contain the text of Hulda-Hrokkinskinna while its last four leaves, added in the 16th century, contain an incomplete version of Hemings þáttr Áslákssonar. The text of Hulda is better than that of Hrokkinskinna.

Hulda-Hrokkinskinna contains a number of þættir. 

Þorgríms þáttr Hallasonar
Hrafns þáttr Guðrúnarsonar
Hreiðars þáttr
Halldórs þáttr Snorrasonar
Auðunar þáttr vestfirzka
Brands þáttr örva
Þorsteins þáttr sögufróða
Þorvarðar þáttr krákunefs
Sneglu-Halla þáttr
Odds þáttr Ófeigssonar
Stúfs þáttr
Gísls þáttr Illugasonar
Ívars þáttr Ingimundarsonar
Gull-Ásu-Þórðar þáttr
Þinga þáttr

The text of Hulda-Hrokkinskinna was printed in the sixth and seventh volumes of Fornmanna sögur in 1831 and 1832. As of 2006, the saga has not been published again. The Danish scholar Jonna Louis-Jensen has done extensive work on Hulda-Hrokkinskinna. In 1968, she published a facsimile edition of Hulda and in 1977 a critical analysis of the saga. She has almost completed a new critical edition of the saga.

References

References
 Andersson, Theodore M. and Kari Ellen Gade (editors and translators) (2000). Morkinskinna: The Earliest Icelandic Chronicle of the Norwegian Kings (1030-1157). Cornell University Press. 
 Berger, Alan J. (2002). "Heimskringla is an abbreviation of Hulda-Hrokkinskinna" in Arkiv för nordisk filologi 2001:65-9. ISSN 0066-7668
 Thunberg, Carl L. (2011). Särkland och dess källmaterial [Serkland and its Source Material]. Göteborgs universitet. CLTS. .
 Fornmanna sögur VI
 Fornmanna sögur VII
 Hulda-Hrokkinskinna
 Hulda
 Hrokkinskinna
 Jonna Louis-Jensen

Further reading
 Louis-Jensen, Jonna (1977). Kongesagastudier: Kompilationen Hulda-Hrokkinskinna. Reitzel, Copenhagen. 

Kings' sagas